Weinmannia fraxinea is a tree in the family Cunoniaceae. The bark is grey to dark brown. Inflorescences bear up to three pairs of flowers. The specific epithet  is from the Latin meaning "ash tree", referring to the leaves' resemblance to those of the genus Fraxinus. In Malaysia's Sarawak state the leaves are used to make a dye. The tree grows in a wide variety of habitats from sea level to  altitude. W. fraxinea is found widely in Malesia.

References

fraxinea
Trees of Malesia
Trees of Papuasia
Flora of the Solomon Islands (archipelago)
Plants described in 1856
Taxa named by Friedrich Anton Wilhelm Miquel